This is a list of the mammal species recorded on and around Ascension Island. Ascension Island has two native mammal species, both of which are beaked whales in the genus Mesoplodon. Neither is thought to be at risk, but there is insufficient data collected on them to allow an assessment to be made.

The following tags are used to highlight each species' conservation status as assessed by the International Union for Conservation of Nature:

Order: Cetacea (whales) 

The order Cetacea includes whales, dolphins and porpoises. They are the mammals most fully adapted to aquatic life with a spindle-shaped nearly hairless body, protected by a thick layer of blubber, and forelimbs and tail modified to provide propulsion underwater.

Suborder: Odontoceti
Superfamily: Platanistoidea
Family: Ziphidae
Subfamily: Hyperoodontinae
Genus: Mesoplodon
 Blainville's beaked whale, M. densirostris 
 Gervais' beaked whale, M. europaeus

See also
List of chordate orders
Lists of mammals by region
List of prehistoric mammals
Mammal classification
List of mammals described in the 2000s

Notes

References

Ascension Island
'mammals
mammals
Ascension Island